Frank Parnell (born 4 November 1935) is an English footballer, who played as a forward in the Football League for Tranmere Rovers.

References

Tranmere Rovers F.C. players
Association football forwards
English Football League players
1935 births
Living people
People from Birkenhead
English footballers